The smiley face murder theory (also known as the smiley face murders, smiley face killings, and smiley face gang) is a theory advanced by retired New York City detectives Kevin Gannon and Anthony Duarte, as well as Dr. Lee Gilbertson, a criminal justice professor and gang expert at St. Cloud State University. It alleges that a number of young men found dead in bodies of water across several Midwestern American states from the late 1990s to the 2010s did not accidentally drown, as concluded by law enforcement agencies, but were victims of a serial killer or killers.

The term "smiley face" became connected to the alleged murders when it was made public that the police had discovered graffiti depicting a smiley face near locations where they think the killer dumped the bodies in at least a dozen of the cases. Gannon wrote a textbook case study on the subject titled "Case Studies in Drowning Forensics." The response of law enforcement investigators and other experts have been largely skeptical.

Gannon and Duarte's investigation

As recently as 2017, Gannon and Duarte were examining evidence going back to the late 1990s that they believe connects the deaths of 45 college-age males whose dead bodies were found in water in 11 states, often after leaving parties or bars where they had been drinking. The men, according to the former detectives, often fit a profile of being popular, athletic and successful students, and most were white.

Gannon and Duarte have theorized that the young men were all murdered, either by an individual or by an organized group of killers. The term "smiley face" became connected to the alleged murders when it was made public that Gannon and Duarte had discovered graffiti depicting a smiley face near locations where they think the killer had dumped the bodies in at least a dozen of the cases.

Reception of the theory 
Other police forces that have investigated the deaths dispute the conclusion that the cases are linked. Police departments that are involved do not currently view the deaths associated with smiley faces present at the scenes as serial-killer activity. The La Crosse, Wisconsin police department, which was in charge of eight of the investigations, concluded that the deaths were accidental drownings of inebriated men, and stated that no smiley-face symbols were found in connection with any of the cases. The Center for Homicide Research published a research brief that also attempted to scientifically refute the theory. In March 2009, Lee Gilbertson, a criminal justice faculty member at St. Cloud State University, voiced his support for the theory on an episode of Larry King Live in which the alleged murders were discussed.

Criminal profiler Pat Brown calls the serial-killer theory "ludicrous," arguing that the evidence does not fit what is known about serial killers. Brown also believes that the smiley-face images found in some of the cases are likely nothing more than coincidences based upon guesses as to where the bodies entered the water, with smiley-face graffiti only found after a wide-area search. "It's not an unusual symbol," she told Minneapolis-based newspaper City Pages. "If you look in any area five miles square, I bet you could find a smiley face."

The Federal Bureau of Investigation (FBI) issued the following statement:

Ruben Rosario of the St. Paul Pioneer Press has questioned Gannon's motives, stating that Gannon has failed to provide any factual evidence that a group of killers exists. Rosario noted that Kristi Piehl, the original reporter on the theory, and some of the parents of the deceased have since expressed skepticism despite initially supporting the idea. Another parent, Kathy Geib, is working with Piehl and others, but their main goal is to convince police to take a second look at cases of alcohol-related drownings.

In popular culture 
 Gannon and Duarte's investigation is the subject of a 2019 docuseries, Smiley Face Killers: The Hunt For Justice, which aired on the Oxygen television network. Produced by Alison Dammann, the six episodes focus on cases of young men who have disappeared and whose bodies are found in a body of water some time later.
 British detective show Scott & Bailey had a series of episodes based on the deaths and ensuing theory.
 The 2017 novel Ill Will by Dan Chaon features a series of mysterious deaths involving drunk young white men whose bodies are found at the bottom of creeks and rivers.
 An episode of documentary series Breaking Homicide referenced the theory.
 The 2020 film Smiley Face Killers, directed by Tim Hunter and written by Bret Easton Ellis, is loosely inspired by the theory.

See also 
 Brian Shaffer; considered a possible victim of the killers.

General:
 List of fugitives from justice who disappeared
 List of serial killers in the United States

References

Citations

Bibliography

External links
 Nationwide Investigations – Gannon and Duarte's official web site

Deaths by drowning in the United States
Male murder victims
Serial murders in the United States
Unidentified serial killers
Unsolved murders in the United States
Violence against men in North America